Carl Stephenson may refer to:

Carl Stephenson (historian) (1886–1954), American medieval historian
Carl Stephenson (author) (1893–after 1960), German author of Leiningen Versus the Ants
Carl Stephenson (producer), founder of musical group Forest for the Trees

See also
Karl Stephenson (disambiguation)